The NER 901 Class was a class of  steam locomotive of the North Eastern Railway, designed by Edward Fletcher. Between 1872 and 1882 55 of the class were built for the NER.

History
From their introduction, the 901 Class were used on the Newcastle-Edinburgh and Newcastle-York runs, hauling  loads. Apart from minor instances of updating, only two of the class underwent extensive rebuilding. She was scrapped in 1914, one of 29 of the class withdrawn between 1913 and 1914. But for the onset of the first World War, the rest of the class would have followed suit. Instead the curtailing of new construction led to a shortage of motive power and new work was found for the 901 Class. Some were drafted on to the coastal line between Scarborough and Bridlington but the majority were stationed at Darlington. From here they worked passenger services over the Stainmore route to Kirkby Stephen, Penrith and Tebay. Darlington also kept them on as pilots.

By 1923 only ten of the class remained and the now preserved No.910 was amongst the final five to be withdrawn from service. 910 was displayed by the NER when new at the 50th anniversary of Steam on the Stockton and Darlington railway in 1875, by the LNER at the 100th anniversary in 1925, and again by British Railways at the 150th anniversary in 1975.

Accidents and incidents

Five people were killed and seventeen were injured.
On 4 October 1894, locomotive No. 904 was one of two locomotives hauling a sleeping car train which overran signals and collided with a freight train that was being shunted at Castle Hills, Yorkshire. One person was killed.

Preservation
Number 910 is preserved by the National Railway Museum. It was moved to the Stainmore Railway Company at Kirkby Stephen East station in 2011 for the Stainmore 150 celebrations, and remains there on loan, housed in the Darlington train shed of the main station building.

References

Bibliography
 
 

0901
2-4-0 locomotives
Railway locomotives introduced in 1872

Passenger locomotives